Praealticus margaritarius is a species of combtooth blenny found in the northwest Pacific ocean, around Japan.  This species grows to a length of  TL.

References

margaritarius
Taxa named by John Otterbein Snyder
Fish described in 1908